Plummer is a surname, derived from the occupation of plumber. Notable people with the name include:

Arts and entertainment 
Amanda Plummer (b. 1957), Canadian-US film, television and stage actress, daughter of Christopher Plummer
Christopher Plummer (1929–2021), Canadian film and theatre actor
David Plummer (musician) (fl. 1990s–present), English-born musician and collaborator on children's books
Denyse Plummer (born 1954), Trinidad and Tobago-born calypso singer
Glenn Plummer (born 1961), US film and television actor
Inez Plummer (c. 1885 – 1964), US stage actress
Jessica Plummer (born 1992), English actress and singer
Joe Plummer (fl. 1990–2000s), Canadian musician
John Plummer (c. 1410 – c. 1483), English composer
Lincoln Plumer (1875–1928), US film actor, also frequently listed as Lincoln Plummer
Louise Plummer (fl. 1985–present), US author
Sanford Plummer (1905–1974), US American Indian artist
Scotty Plummer (1961–1992), US musician

Military and law enforcement 
Charles Plummer (sheriff) (fl. 1957–2007), US police officer in California
Henry Plummer (1832–1864), US historical figure, sheriff in Montana
Joseph B. Plummer (1816–1862), US military leader
Norman Plummer (1924–1999), English war hero and footballer
Raymond Eugene Plummer (1913–1987), US attorney and judge

Politics 
Albert Plummer (1840–1912) US physician and legislator
Beatrice Plummer, Baroness Plummer (1903–1972), British Peeress
Desmond Plummer (1914–2009), English politician
Franklin E. Plummer (died 1847), US political figure
Orlando Plummer (1836–1913), US physician and political figure

Science and medicine 
Andrew Plummer (1697–1756), professor of chemistry and medicine, University of Edinburgh
Henry Crozier Keating Plummer (1875–1946), English astronomer
Henry Stanley Plummer (1874–1936), US physician instrumental in founding the Mayo Clinic
Ruth Plummer (fl. 2003–present), British cancer researcher
Violet Plummer (1873–1962), South Australian physician
Ward Plummer (1940–2020), US physicist

Sports 
Ahmed Plummer (born 1976), US football player
Bill Plummer (born 1947), US baseball player
Calvin Plummer (born 1963), English footballer
Chris Plummer (born 1976), English footballer
Dwayne Plummer (born 1978), English footballer
Elton Plummer (1914–1988), Australian Rules footballer
Elwood Plummer, American basketball coach
Federico Plummer (1929–2004), Panamanian boxer
Gary Plummer (basketball) (born 1962), Israeli-American basketball player
Gary Plummer (American football) (born 1960), American football player
Harold Plummer (fl. 1929–1933), English footballer
Harry Plummer (Australian footballer) (1912–1993), Australian rules footballer
Jake Plummer (born 1974), US football player
Jason Plummer (1969–2021), Australian swimmer
Karen Plummer (born 1951), New Zealand cricketer
Kathryn Plummer (born 1998), American volleyball player
Konya Plummer (born 1997), Jamaican (women's soccer) footballer
Matty Plummer (born 1989), English footballer
Nick Plummer (born 1996), American baseball player
Norma Plummer (born 1944), Australian netball player
Norman Plummer (1924–1999), English war hero and footballer 
Peter Plummer (born 1947), English cricketer
Reg Plummer (field hockey) (born 1953), Canadian field hockey player
Reg Plummer (rugby player) (1888–1953), Welsh rugby player
Scott Plummer (born 1966), Australian cricketer
Tristan Plummer (born 1990), English footballer

Other 
Alfred Plummer (1841-1926), Master of University College Durham and contributor to the Cambridge Bible for Schools and Colleges
Brian Plummer (1936–2003), Welsh writer and dog breeder
Charles Plummer (1857–1927), English historian
Chester Plummer (1945–1976), US taxi driver, killed while trying to invade the White House in 1976
George Winslow Plummer (1876–1944), founder of Societas Rosicruciana in America
Howard Z. Plummer (1899–1980), US Christian minister
Leslie Plummer (1901–1963), English newspaper executive
James Henry Plummer (1848–1932), Canadian financier
James W. Plummer (1920–2013), American Director of the National Reconnaissance Office
Mary Plummer (1849–1922), US figure, wife of Georges Clemenceau
Penelope Plummer (born 1949), Australian model
Rachel Plummer (1818–1839), US writer who was kidnapped by Comanche Indians

Fictional characters 
Evelyn Plummer, a character in British soap opera Coronation Street
Polly Plummer, fictional main character in The Magician's Nephew

English-language surnames
Occupational surnames
English-language occupational surnames